The Kansas City Royals' season of 2011 was the 43rd for the Royals franchise. It was the fifth full season with Dayton Moore as general manager. The team was managed by Ned Yost in his first full season with the Royals. It was the 26th straight year of the Royals missing the playoffs.

Offseason

On November 10, 2010, the Royals traded outfielder David DeJesus for the right-handed, starting pitcher Vin Mazzaro from the Oakland Athletics and minor league pitcher Justin Marks. Mazzaro was 10–17 with a 4.72 ERA in 41 career Major League appearances, including 35 starts, for the Athletics in 2009 and 2010.

Pitching

Bruce Chen began the year with a 4–1 record and 3.59 ERA in seven starts for the Royals. Chen was placed on the 15-day Disabled List on May 11 (retroactive to May 6), with a strain, and right-handed pitcher Vin Mazzaro was recalled from the Omaha Storm Chasers. Mazzaro's first start was on May 11 versus the New York Yankees. Mazzaro's stay with the Royals was a short-lived one. Following his second appearance on May 16, in which he allowed 14 earned runs in  innings of relief, a team record for runs given up by one pitcher in a game, and the worst performance of a pitcher in the Major Leagues since the first half of the 20th century,– Mazzaro was optioned to Omaha, and left-hand relief pitcher Everett Teaford was called up to replace him. Mazzaro pitched  innings with a 22.74 ERA in his two appearances.

Regular season

The Royals opened the season at home on Thursday, March 31, in a four-game weekend series versus the Los Angeles Angels of Anaheim. It was their first Opening Day meeting since 1975 when the Angels hosted the Royals. Luke Hochevar, who was the first-round draft pick of the Royals in 2006, was chosen to pitch in his first Opening Day start. He gave up four runs, including two sole home runs, in  innings for the loss. The opposing starter Jered Weaver pitched  scoreless innings to earn his first win of the season with Fernando Rodney closing the game in the ninth inning for his first save as the Angels defeated the Royals, 4–2. The attendance for the game was 40,055, (currently) the highest of any home game during the season. This game also saw the major league debut of three Royals rookie pitchers: Aaron Crow, Tim Collins, and Nathan Adcock.

After two games versus the Chicago White Sox, the Royals finished their home opening series with a 4–2 record and ½ game lead in their division. It was the best home opening series since 2004 when they also began the season at home by winning 4 out of 6 games. This season's series was notable because three of their wins came on their final at-bat, and the last three games each extended into extra innings.

Although the team was successful during the first half of April–occupying first place on eight of those days while winning 10 of 14 games–the latter half of the month saw the team lose nine games as they fell  games behind the division-leading Cleveland Indians. During a six-game losing streak while on the road, Royals pitchers gave up 17 home runs and had an ERA of 7.88. It included three games at Cleveland where the Indians were in the midst of a 14-home-game winning streak. With a 14–13 record, it was only the third time in 22 years that the Royals ended the month with more wins than losses; the last time was in 2009.

The team's worst loss came at home on May 16 in a 19–1 rout by the Cleveland Indians. After giving up three walks to load the bases in the first inning, starting pitcher Kyle Davies left the game with an injury. Nathan Adcock replaced him and allowed two of the base runners to score–giving Davies his sixth loss of the season. Vin Mazzaro, who had been scheduled to start the next day, entered the game in the third inning and gave up 14 earned runs on 11 hits in just  innings. Three of the ten runs scored in the fourth inning came on a 3-run home run by Michael Brantley. The 18-run deficit matched the worst margin of defeat in the team's history which has occurred twice before, the most recent being the previous season on July 26 when the Minnesota Twins also won 19–1.

Because of the Twins' plague of injuries, the Royals came out fourth place. During a stretch of games from September 11 to 17, the Royals won seven straight, giving them their longest winning record since the 2006 season. However, the Royals were no-hit to the fifth/sixth inning twice in a row (the first, a perfect game). During the last week of the season, Billy Butler, Alex Gordon and Louis Coleman were all struck by the flu, giving Jarrod Dyson and Lorenzo Cain a chance in the big leagues.

Season standings

Record vs. opponents

Game log

|- bgcolor="ffbbbb"
| 1 || March 31|| Los Angeles Angels || L 2–4 || Weaver (1–0) || Hochevar (0–1) || Rodney (1) || 40,055 || 0–1
|- bgcolor="bbffbb"
| 2 || April 1|| Los Angeles Angels || W 2–1 || Soria (1–0) || Kohn (0–1) ||  || 13,302 || 1–1
|- bgcolor="bbffbb"
| 3 || April 2|| Los Angeles Angels || W 5–4 || Crow (1–0) || Jepsen (0–1) || Soria (1) || 17,328 || 2–1
|- bgcolor="bbffbb"
| 4 || April 3|| Los Angeles Angels || W 12–9 (13) || Collins (1–0) || Bulger (0–1) ||  || 14,085 || 3–1
|- bgcolor="bbffbb"
| 5 || April 5|| Chicago White Sox || W 7–6 (12) || Jeffress (1–0) || Peña (0–1) ||  || 12,641 || 4–1
|-
|- bgcolor="ffbbbb"
| 6 || April 6|| Chicago White Sox || L 7–10 (12) || Sale (1–0) || O'Sullivan (0–1) ||  || 13,360 || 4–2
|- bgcolor="ffbbbb"
| 7 || April 8|| @ Detroit Tigers || L 2–5 || Scherzer (2–0) || Davies (0–1) || Valverde (2) || 44,799 || 4–3
|- bgcolor="bbffbb"
| 8 || April 9|| @ Detroit Tigers || W 3–1 || Chen (1–0) || Coke (0–2) || Soria (2) || 33,810 || 5–3
|- bgcolor="bbffbb"
| 9 || April 10|| @ Detroit Tigers || W 9–5 || Hochevar (1–1) || Porcello (0–2) || Soria (3) || 28,984 || 6–3
|- bgcolor="ffbbbb"
| 10 || April 12|| @ Minnesota Twins || L 3–4 (10) || Hughes (1–0) || Tejeda (0–1) ||  || 38,154 || 6–4
|- bgcolor="bbffbb" 
| 11 || April 13|| @ Minnesota Twins || W 10–5 || Davies (1–1) || Liriano (0–3) || Jeffress (1) || 36,286 || 7–4
|- bgcolor="bbffbb" 
| 12 || April 14|| Seattle Mariners || W 5–1 (8) || Chen (2–0) || Fister (0–3) || || 8,811 || 8–4
|- bgcolor="bbffbb" 
| 13 || April 15|| Seattle Mariners || W 6–5 || Hochevar (2–1) || Bédard (0–3) || Soria (4) || 13,686 || 9–4
|- bgcolor="bbffbb" 
| 14 || April 16|| Seattle Mariners || W 7–0 || O'Sullivan (1–1) || Hernández (1–2) || || 22,364 || 10–4
|- bgcolor="ffbbbb"
| 15 || April 17|| Seattle Mariners || L 2–3 || Pineda (2–1) || Francis (0–1) || League (3) || 19,424 || 10–5
|- bgcolor="ffbbbb"
| 16 || April 18|| Cleveland Indians || L 3–7 (10) || Smith (1–0) || Collins (1–1) || || 12,214 || 10–6
|- bgcolor="bbffbb" 
| 17 || April 19|| Cleveland Indians || W 5–4 || Chen (3–0) || Gómez (0–1) || Soria (5) || 10,506 || 11–6
|- bgcolor="ffbbbb"
| 18 || April 20|| Cleveland Indians || L 5–7 || Masterson (4–0) || Hochevar (2–2) || Perez (6) || 10,080 || 11–7
|- bgcolor="bbffbb" 
| 19 || April 21|| Cleveland Indians || W 3–2 || Crow (2–0) || Perez (0–1) || || 9,279 || 12–7
|- bgcolor="ffbbbb" 
| 20 || April 22|| @ Texas Rangers || L 6–11 || Holland (3–1) || Francis (0–2) || || 45,769 || 12–8
|- bgcolor="ffbbbb" 
| 21 || April 23|| @ Texas Rangers || L 1–3 || Ogando (3–0) || Davies (1–2) || Oliver (1) || 45,506 || 12–9
|- bgcolor="ffbbbb"
| 22 || April 24|| @ Texas Rangers || L 8–7 || Wilson (3–0) || Chen (3–1) || Rhodes (1) || 28,284 || 12–10
|- bgcolor="ffbbbb"
| 23 || April 26|| @ Cleveland Indians || L 4–9 || Masterson (5–0)  || Hochevar (2–3) ||    || 9,650 || 12–11
|- bgcolor="ffbbbb"
| 24 || April 27|| @ Cleveland Indians || L 2–7 || Tomlin (4–0) || Francis (0–3) ||   || 9,722 || 12–12
|- bgcolor="ffbbbb"
| 25 || April 28|| @ Cleveland Indians || L 2–8 || Carmona (2–3) || Davies (1–3) ||   || 9,076 || 12–13
|- bgcolor="bbffbb" 
| 26 || April 29|| Minnesota Twins || W 4–3 || Wood (1–0) || Burnett (0–1) || Soria (6) || 31,407 || 13–13
|- bgcolor="bbffbb" 
| 27 || April 30|| Minnesota Twins || W 11–2 || Adcock (1–0) || Duensing (2–1) ||  || 22,099 || 14–13
|-

|- bgcolor="bbffbb" 
| 28 || May 1|| Minnesota Twins || W 10–3 || Hochevar (3–3) || Pavano (2–3) ||   || 18,108 || 15–13
|- bgcolor="bbffbb"
| 29 || May 3|| Baltimore Orioles || W 6–5 10 || Collins (2–1) || Berken (0–2) ||  || 11,986 || 16–13
|- bgcolor="ffbbbb"
| 30 || May 4|| Baltimore Orioles || L 2–3 || Arrieta (4–1) || Davies (1–4) || Gregg (6) || 11,130 || 16–14
|- bgcolor="bbffbb"
| 31 || May 5|| Baltimore Orioles || W 9–1 || Chen (4–1) || Tillman (1–3) ||  || 29,927 || 17–14
|- bgcolor="ffbbbb"
| 32 || May 6|| Oakland Athletics || L 2–3 || Gonzalez (4–2) || O'Sullivan (1–2) || Fuentes (8) || 30,690 || 17–15
|- bgcolor="bbffbb"
| 33 || May 7|| Oakland Athletics || W 4–3 || Soria (2–0) || McCarthy (1–3) ||  || 25,828 || 18–15
|- bgcolor="ffbbbb" 
| 34 || May 8|| Oakland Athletics || L 2–5 || Ross (2–2) || Francis (0–4) || Fuentes (9) || 22,435 || 18–16
|- bgcolor="ffbbbb"
| 35 || May 10|| @ New York Yankees || L 1–3 || García (2–2) || Davies (1–5) || Rivera (13) || 41,275 || 18–17
|- bgcolor="bbffbb" 
| 36 || May 11|| @ New York Yankees || W 4–3 (11) || Soria (3–0) || Carlyle (0–1) || Coleman (1) || 40,164 || 19–17
|- bgcolor="bbffbb"
| 37 || May 12|| @ New York Yankees || W 11–5 || O'Sullivan (2–2) || Nova (3–3) || || 41,790 || 20–17
|- bgcolor="ffbbbb"
| 38 || May 13|| @ Detroit Tigers || L 1–3 || Verlander (4–3) || Hochevar (3–4) || Valverde (9) || 33,641 || 20–18
|- bgcolor="ffbbbb"
| 39 || May 14|| @ Detroit Tigers || L 0–3 || Penny (4–3) || Francis (0–5) || Valverde (10) || 37,647 || 20–19
|- bgcolor="bbbbbb" 
| – || May 15|| @ Detroit Tigers || -|| – || – || – || – || -
|- bgcolor="ffbbbb" 
| 40 || May 16|| Cleveland Indians || L 1–19 || Tomlin (5–1) || Davies (1–6) ||  || 12,242 || 20–20
|- bgcolor="ffbbbb" 
| 41 || May 17|| Cleveland Indians || L 3–7 || Carrasco (2–2) || O'Sullivan (2–3) ||  || 17,712 || 20–21
|- bgcolor="ffbbbb"
| 42 || May 18|| Texas Rangers || L 4–5 (11) || Rhodes (2–2) || Jeffress (1–1) || Lowe (1) || 13,789 || 20–22
|- bgcolor="bbffbb" 
| 43 || May 19|| Texas Rangers || W 2–1 (10) || Holland (1–0) || Oliver (1–5) ||  || 12,355 || 21–22
|- bgcolor="bbffbb"
| 44 || May 20|| St. Louis Cardinals || W 3–0 || Francis (1–5) || Carpenter (1–4) || Soria (7) || 26,816 || 22–22
|- bgcolor="ffbbbb"
| 45 || May 21|| St. Louis Cardinals || L 0–3 || Westbrook (4–3) || Collins (2–2) || Salas (6) || 32,229 || 22–23
|- bgcolor="ffbbbb"
| 46 || May 22|| St. Louis Cardinals || L 8–9 (10) || Motte (2–1) || Coleman (0–1) || Salas (7) || 28,195 || 22–24
|- bgcolor="ffbbbb"
| 47 || May 24|| @ Baltimore Orioles || L 3–5 || Simón (1–0) || Soria (3–1) ||  || 14,077 || 22–25
|- bgcolor="ffbbbb"
| 48 || May 25|| @ Baltimore Orioles || L 2–9 || Arrieta (6–2) || Hochevar (3–5) ||  || 15,740 || 22–26
|- bgcolor="ffbbbb"
| 49 || May 26|| @ Baltimore Orioles || L 5–6(12) || Accardo (3–1) || Coleman (0–2) ||  || 22,720 || 22–27
|- bgcolor="bbffbb"
| 50 || May 27|| @ Texas Rangers || W 12–7 (14) || Wood (2–0) || Bush (0–1) ||  || 39,390 || 23–27
|- bgcolor="ffbbbb"
| 51 || May 28|| @ Texas Rangers || L 1–10 || Harrison (5–4) || O'Sullivan (2–4) || Tateyama (1) || 40,240 || 23–28
|- bgcolor="ffbbbb" 
| 52 || May 29|| @ Texas Rangers || L 6–7 || Rhodes (3–2) || Soria (3–2) ||  || 45,011 || 23–29
|- bgcolor="ffbbbb"
| 53 || May 30|| Los Angeles Angels || L 8–10 || Jepsen (1–2) || Soria (3–3) || Rodney (3) || 24,406 || 23–30
|- bgcolor="bbffbb"
| 54 || May 31|| Los Angeles Angels || W 7–3 || Francis (2–5) || Piñeiro (2–2) ||  || 14,174 || 24–30
|-

|- bgcolor="bbffbb"
| 55 || June 1|| Los Angeles Angels || W 2–0 || Collins (3–2) || Downs (3–2) ||  || 12,022 || 25–30
|- bgcolor="ffbbbb" 
| 56 || June 2|| Minnesota Twins || L 2–8 || Swarzak (1–2) || O'Sullivan (2–5) ||  || 14,584 || 25–31
|- bgcolor="ffbbbb"
| 57 || June 3|| Minnesota Twins || L 2–5 || Pavano (3–5) || Duffy (0–1) ||  || 32,443 || 25–32
|- bgcolor="ffbbbb" 
| 58 || June 4|| Minnesota Twins || L 2–7 || Blackburn (5–4) || Hochevar (3–6) ||  || 27,861 || 25–33
|- bgcolor="ffbbbb" 
| 59 || June 5|| Minnesota Twins || L 0–6 || Duensing (3–5) || Francis (2–6) ||  || 21,704 || 25–34
|- bgcolor="bbffbb"
| 60 || June 6|| Toronto Blue Jays || W 3–2 (11) || Soria (4–3) || Francisco (1–3) ||  || 12,194 || 26–34
|- bgcolor="ffbbbb"
| 61 || June 7|| Toronto Blue Jays || L 5–8 || Drabek (4–4) || Mazzaro (0–1) || Rauch (7) || 16,539 || 26–35
|- bgcolor="ffbbbb"
| 62 || June 8|| Toronto Blue Jays || L 8–9 || Villanueva (4–0) || Duffy (0–1) || Janssen (1) || 12,152 || 26–36
|- bgcolor="bbffbb"
| 63 || June 9|| Toronto Blue Jays || W 3–2 || Hochevar (4–6) || Romero (5–6) || Soria (8) || 13,941 || 27–36
|- bgcolor="bbffbb" 
| 64 || June 10|| @ Los Angeles Angels || W 4–2 || Francis (3–6) || Santana (3–6) || Soria (9) || 38,254 || 28–36
|- bgcolor="ffbbbb" 
| 65 || June 11|| @ Los Angeles Angels || L 5–7 || Downs (4–2) || Collins (3–3) || Walden (14) || 38,911 || 28–37
|- bgcolor="bbffbb" 
| 66 || June 12|| @ Los Angeles Angels || W 9–0 || Mazzaro (1–1) || Chatwood (3–4) ||  || 39,114 || 29–37
|- bgcolor="bbffbb"
| 67 || June 14|| @ Oakland Athletics || W 7–4 || Duffy (1–2) || Cahill (6–5) || Soria (10) || 11,439 || 30–37
|- bgcolor="ffbbbb" 
| 68 || June 15|| @ Oakland Athletics || L 1–2 || Outman (2–1) || Hochevar (4–7) || Bailey (2) || 16,392 || 30–38
|- bgcolor="ffbbbb" 
| 69 || June 16|| @ Oakland Athletics || L 4–8 || Gonzalez (6–5) || Francis (3–7) ||  || 11,775 || 30–39
|- bgcolor="bbffbb" 
| 70 || June 17|| @ St. Louis Cardinals || W 5–4 || Wood (3–0) || Carpenter (1–7) || Soria (11) || 40,674 || 31–39
|- bgcolor="ffbbbb" 
| 71 || June 18|| @ St. Louis Cardinals || L 4–5 || Motte (3–1) || Holland (1–1) || Salas (12) || 43,102 || 31–40
|- bgcolor="ffbbbb" 
| 72 || June 19|| @ St. Louis Cardinals || L 4–5 || Salas (4–1) || Collins (3–4) ||  || 41,660 || 31–41
|- bgcolor="ffbbbb"
| 73 || June 21|| Arizona Diamondbacks || L 2–7 || Saunders (4–7) || Hochevar (4–8) ||  || 19,305 || 31–42
|- bgcolor="ffbbbb"
| 74 || June 22|| Arizona Diamondbacks || L 2–3 || Kennedy (8–2) || Francis (3–8) || Putz (19) || 14,265 || 31–43
|- bgcolor="ffbbbb"
| 75 || June 23|| Arizona Diamondbacks || L 3–5 || Hudson (9–5) || Paulino (0–5) || Putz (20) || 23,610 || 31–44
|- bgcolor="ffbbbb"
| 76 || June 24|| Chicago Cubs || L 4–6 || Marshall (4–2) || Crow (2–1) || Mármol (16) || 32,921 || 31–45
|- bgcolor="bbffbb" 
| 77 || June 25|| Chicago Cubs || W 3–2 || Holland (2–1) || Samardzija (5–4) || Soria (12) || 38,744 || 32–45
|- bgcolor="bbffbb" 
| 78 || June 26|| Chicago Cubs || W 6–3 || Hochevar (5–8) || Wells (1–2) || Soria (13) || 28,401 || 33–45
|- bgcolor="ffbbbb"
| 79 || June 27|| @ San Diego Padres || L 3–4 || Latos (5–8) || Francis (3–9) || Bell (21) || 23,635 || 33–46
|- bgcolor="ffbbbb"
| 80 || June 28|| @ San Diego Padres || L 2–4 || Richard (4–9) || Paulino (0–6) || Bell (22) || 20,250 || 33–47
|- bgcolor="ffbbbb"
| 81 || June 29|| @ San Diego Padres || L 1–4 || Stauffer (4–5) || Chen (4–2) || Bell (23) || 24,461 || 33–48
|-

|- bgcolor="ffbbbb"
| 82 || July 1|| @ Colorado Rockies || L 0–9 || Nicasio (3–1) || Duffy (1–3) ||  || 48,282 || 33–49
|- bgcolor="ffbbbb"
| 83 || July 2|| @ Colorado Rockies || L 6–9 || G. Reynolds (3–0) || Davies (1–7) || Street (24) || 49,227 || 33–50
|- bgcolor="bbffbb"
| 84 || July 3|| @ Colorado Rockies || W 16–8 || Wood (4–0) || Hammel (4–8) || || 40,269 || 34–50
|- bgcolor="ffbbbb"
| 85 || July 4|| @ Chicago White Sox || L 4–5 || Santos (3–3) || Crow (2–2) ||  || 31,077 || 34–51
|- bgcolor="bbffbb"
| 86 || July 5|| @ Chicago White Sox || W 5–3 || Paulino (1–6) || Peavy (4–2) || Soria (14) || 20,695 || 35–51
|- bgcolor="bbffbb"
| 87 || July 6|| @ Chicago White Sox || W 4–1 || Chen (5–2) || Jackson (5–7) || Soria (15) || 27,233 || 36–51
|- bgcolor="ffbbbb"
| 88 || July 7|| Detroit Tigers || L 1–3 || Scherzer (10–4) || Duffy (1–4) || Valverde (22) || 16,355 || 36–52
|- bgcolor="ffbbbb"
| 89 || July 8|| Detroit Tigers || L 4–6 || Porcello (8–6) || Davies (1–8) || Valverde (23) || 34,563 || 36–53
|- bgcolor="bbffbb"
| 90 || July 9|| Detroit Tigers || W 13–6 || Holland (3–1) || Furbush (1–3) || Teaford (1) || 25,941 || 37–53
|- bgcolor="ffbbbb"
| 91 || July 10|| Detroit Tigers || L 1–2 || Verlander (12–4) || Francis (3–10) || Valverde (24) || 18,373 || 37–54
|- bgcolor="ffbbbb"
| 92 || July 14|| @ Minnesota Twins || L 4–8 || Liriano (6–7) || Chen (5–3) || || 39,584 || 37–55
|- bgcolor="bbffbb"
| 93 || July 15|| @ Minnesota Twins || W 2–1 || Collins (4–4) || Capps (2–5) || Soria (16) || 39,177 || 38–55
|- bgcolor="ffbbbb"
| 94 || July 16|| @ Minnesota Twins || L 3–4 || Perkins (1–1) || Francis (3–11) || Nathan (4) || 41,295 || 38–56
|- bgcolor="ffbbbb"
| 95 || July 17|| @ Minnesota Twins || L 3–4 || Duensing (7–7) || Paulino (1–7) || Nathan (5) || 38,786 || 38–57
|- bgcolor="ffbbbb"
| 96 || July 18|| Chicago White Sox || L 2–5 || Buehrle (7–5) || Davies (1–9) || || 17,190 || 38–58
|- bgcolor="bbffbb"
| 97 || July 19|| Chicago White Sox || W 4–2 || Duffy (2–4) || Peavy (4–4) || Soria (17) || 20,126 || 39–58
|- bgcolor="bbffbb"
| 98 || July 20|| Chicago White Sox || W 2–1 (11) || Crow (3–2) || Sale (2–1) || || 13,831 || 40–58
|- bgcolor="bbffbb"
| 99 || July 22|| Tampa Bay Rays || W 10–4 || Hochevar (6–8) || Davis (7–7) ||  || 27,824 || 41–58
|- bgcolor="bbffbb"
| 100 || July 23|| Tampa Bay Rays || W 5–4 (10) || Soria (5–3) || Gomes (0–1) || || 27,643 || 42–58
|- bgcolor="ffbbbb"
| 101 || July 24|| Tampa Bay Rays || L 0–5 || Cobb (3–0) || Paulino (1–8) || || 23,735 || 42–59
|- bgcolor="bbffbb"
| 102 || July 25|| @ Boston Red Sox || W 3–1 (14)|| Coleman (1–2) || Williams (0–1)|| Soria (18) || 37,727 || 43–59
|- bgcolor="ffbbbb"
| 103 || July 26|| @ Boston Red Sox || L 9–13 || Aceves (6–1) || Adcock (1–1) || || 37,460 || 43–60
|- bgcolor="ffbbbb"
| 104 || July 27|| @ Boston Red Sox || L 5–12 || Lackey (9–8) || Chen (5–4) || || 38,329 || 43–61
|- bgcolor="bbffbb" 
| 105 || July 28|| @ Boston Red Sox || W 4–3 || Hochevar (7–8) || Beckett (9–4) || Soria (19) || 37,822 || 44–61
|- bgcolor="bbffbb"  
| 106 || July 29|| @ Cleveland Indians || W 12–0 || Francis (4–11) || Carrasco (8–9) || || 35,390 || 45–61
|- bgcolor="ffbbbb"
| 107 || July 30|| @ Cleveland Indians || L 2–5 || Sipp (6–2) || Soria (5–4) || || 31,436 || 45–62
|- bgcolor="bbffbb"
| 108 || July 31|| @ Cleveland Indians || W 5–3 || Duffy (3–4) || Carmona (5–11) || Soria (20) || 21,101 || 46–62
|-

|- bgcolor="ffbbbb"
| 109 || August 2|| Baltimore Orioles || L 2–8 || Simón (3–4) || Chen (5–5) || || 17,116 || 46–63
|- bgcolor="bbffbb"
| 110 || August 3|| Baltimore Orioles || W 6–2 || Hochevar (8–8) || Guthrie (5–15) || Holland (1) || 14,187 || 47–53
|- bgcolor="bbffbb"
| 111 || August 4|| Baltimore Orioles || W 9–4 || Wood (5–0) || Britton (6–9) || – || 12,161 || 48–53
|- bgcolor="ffbbbb"
| 112 || August 5|| Detroit Tigers || L 3–4 (10) || Schlereth (1–1) || Crow (3–3) || Valverde (31) || 28,565 || 48–64
|- bgcolor="ffbbbb"
| 113 || August 6|| Detroit Tigers || L 3–4 || Verlander (16–5) || Duffy (3–5) || Valverde (32) || 25,818 || 48–65
|- bgcolor="bbffbb"
| 114 || August 7|| Detroit Tigers || W 4–3 || Chen (6–5) || Scherzer (11–7) || Soria (21) || 20,132 || 49–65
|- bgcolor="ffbbbb" 
| 115 || August 8|| @ Tampa Bay Rays || L 1–2 || Farnsworth (4–1) || Wood (5–1) || – || 10,742 || 49–66
|- bgcolor="ffbbbb" 
| 116 || August 9|| @ Tampa Bay Rays || L 0–4 || Shields (11–9) || Francis (4–12) || – || 10,124 || 49–67
|- bgcolor="ffbbbb"
| 117 || August 10|| @ Tampa Bay Rays || L 7–8 || McGee (1–1) || Soria (5–5) || – || 11,706 || 49–68
|- bgcolor="ffbbbb"
| 118 || August 11|| @ Tampa Bay Rays || L 1–4 || Niemann (7–4) || Duffy (3–6) || Farnsworth (21) || 13,942 || 49–69
|- bgcolor="bbffbb"
| 119 || August 12|| @ Chicago White Sox || W 5–1 || Chen (7–5) || Stewart (1–2) || Holland (2) || 23,130 || 50–69
|- bgcolor="ffbbbb"
| 120 || August 13|| @ Chicago White Sox || L 4–5 || Crain (7–3) || Hochevar (8–9) || Sale (4) || 24,854 || 50–70
|- bgcolor="ffbbbb"
| 121 || August 14|| @ Chicago White Sox || L 2–6 || Danks (5–9) || Francis (4–13) || – || 25,517 || 50–71
|- bgcolor="ffbbbb"
| 122 || August 15|| New York Yankees || L 4–7 || Burnett (9–9) || Paulino (1–5) || Rivera (31) || 24,879 || 50–72
|- bgcolor="ffbbbb"
| 123 || August 16|| New York Yankees || L 7–9 || Nova (12–4) || Duffy (3–7) || Rivera (32) || 22,258 || 50–73
|- bgcolor="bbffbb"
| 124 || August 17|| New York Yankees || W 5–4 || Chen (8–5) || Colón (8–7) || Soria (22) || 22,435 || 51–73
|- bgcolor="ffbbbb"
| 125 || August 18|| Boston Red Sox || L 3–4 || Beckett (10–5) || Hochevar (8–10) || Papelbon (29) || 20,547 || 51–74
|- bgcolor="ffbbbb"
| 126 || August 19|| Boston Red Sox || L 1–7 || Miller (5–1) || Francis (4–14) || Aceves (2) || 21,262 || 51–75
|- bgcolor="bbffbb"
| 127 || August 20|| Boston Red Sox || W 9–4 || Paulino (2–9) || Albers (4–4) ||  || 28,588 || 52–75
|- bgcolor="ffbbbb"
| 128 || August 21|| Boston Red Sox || L 1–6 || Lester (13–6) || Duffy (3–8) || || 25,723 || 52–76
|- bgcolor="bbffbb"
| 129 || August 23|| @ Toronto Blue Jays || W 6–4 || Chen (9–5) || Morrow (9–8) || Soria (23) || 20,009 || 53–76
|- bgcolor="ffbbbb"
| 130 || August 24|| @ Toronto Blue Jays || L 3–4 || Litsch (5–3) || Coleman (1–3) || Francisco (11) || 18,292 || 53–77
|- bgcolor="bbffbb"
| 131 || August 25|| @ Toronto Blue Jays || W 9–6 || Francis (5–14) || Cecil (4–7) || || 17,355 || 54–77
|- bgcolor="ffbbbb"
| 132 || August 26|| @ Cleveland Indians || L 1–2 || Jiménez (8–10) || Paulino (2–10) || C. Perez (28) || 41,337 || 54–78
|- bgcolor="ffbbbb"
| 133 || August 27|| @ Cleveland Indians || L 7–8 || Smith (3–3) || Coleman (1–4) || C. Perez (29) || 35,370 || 54–79
|- bgcolor="bbffbb"
| 134 || August 28|| @ Cleveland Indians || W 2–1 || Chen (10–5) || Masterson (10–8) || Soria (24) || 27,908 || 55–79
|- bgcolor="bbffbb"
| 135 || August 29|| @ Detroit Tigers || W 9–5 || Hochevar (9–10) || Scherzer (13–8) || Wood (1) || 32,423 || 56–79
|- bgcolor="ffbbbb"
| 136 || August 30|| @ Detroit Tigers || L 1–2 (10) || Benoit (4–3) || Crow (3–4) || || 34,866 || 56–80
|- bgcolor="ffbbbb"
| 137 || August 31|| @ Detroit Tigers || L 4–5 || Schlereth (2–1) || Wood (5–2) || Valverde (40) || 33,572 || 56–81
|-

|- bgcolor="bbffbb"
| 138 || September 1|| @ Detroit Tigers || W 11–8 || Crow (3–4) || Coke (2–9) || Soria (25) || 39,084 || 57–81
|- bgcolor="ffbbbb"
| 139 || September 2|| Cleveland Indians || L 4–5 || Masterson (11–8) || Chen (10–6) || Perez (31) || 27,251 || 57–82
|- bgcolor="bbffbb"
| 140 || September 3|| Cleveland Indians || W 5–1 || Hochevar (10–10) || Huff (2–3) || || 27,126 || 58–82
|- bgcolor="ffbbbb"
| 141 || September 4|| Cleveland Indians || L 6–9 || Gómez (2–2) || Francis (5–15) || Perez (32) || 34,015 || 58–83
|- bgcolor="bbffbb" 
| 142 || September 5|| @ Oakland Athletics || W 11–6 || Holland (4–1) || Bailey (0–4) || || 14,577 || 59–83
|- bgcolor="bbffbb"  
| 143 || September 6|| @ Oakland Athletics || W 7–4 || Duffy (4–8) || Gonzalez (12–12) || Soria (26) || 12,064 || 60–83
|- bgcolor="ffbbbb" 
| 144 || September 7|| @ Oakland Athletics || L 0–7 || Moscoso (8–8) || Chen (10–7) || || 13,132 || 60–84
|- bgcolor="ffbbbb"
| 145 || September 8|| @ Seattle Mariners || L 1–4 || Vargas (8–13) || Hochevar (10–10) || League (34) || 14,377 || 60–85
|- bgcolor="ffbbbb" 
| 146 || September 9|| @ Seattle Mariners || L 3–7 || Beavan (4–5) || Francis (5–16) || || 14,805 || 60–86
|- bgcolor="bbffbb"
| 147 || September 10|| @ Seattle Mariners || W 4–2 || Paulino (3–10) || Pineda (9–10) || Soria (27) || 17,884 || 61–86
|- bgcolor="bbffbb" 
| 148 || September 11|| @ Seattle Mariners || W 2–1 || Teaford (1–0) || Vasquez (1–3) || Soria (28) || 20,951 || 62–86
|- bgcolor="bbffbb" 
| 149 || September 13|| Minnesota Twins || W 4–0 || Chen (11–7) || Pavano (8–12) || || 25,253 || 63–86
|- bgcolor="bbffbb"
| 150 || September 14|| Minnesota Twins || W 7–3 || Hochevar (10–10) || Hendriks (0–2) || Holland (3) || 19,076 || 64–86
|- bgcolor="bbffbb"
| 151 || September 15|| Chicago White Sox || W 7–2 || Francis (6–16) || Buehrle (11–9) || || 17,737 || 65–86
|- bgcolor="bbffbb"
| 152 || September 16|| Chicago White Sox || W 7–6 || Holland (5–1) || Thornton (1–5) || || 24,918 || 66–86
|- bgcolor="bbffbb" 
| 153 || September 17|| Chicago White Sox || W 10–3 || Teaford (2–0) || Stewart (2–5) || Adcock (1) || 31,264 || 67–86
|- bgcolor="ffbbbb"
| 154 || September 18|| Chicago White Sox || L 5–10 || Danks (7–12) || Chen (11–8) || || 29,480 || 67–87
|- bgcolor="bbffbb"
| 155 || September 20|| Detroit Tigers || W 10–2 || Mendoza (1–0) || Penny (10–11) || || 26,953 || 68–87
|- bgcolor="ffbbbb" 
| 156 || September 21|| Detroit Tigers || L 3–6 || Fister (10–13) || Herrera (0–1) || Valverde (47) || 28,776 || 68–88
|- bgcolor="bbffbb" 
| 157 || September 23|| @ Chicago White Sox || W 11–1 || Chen (12–8) || Stewart (2–6) || || 21,744 || 69–88
|- bgcolor="ffbbbb"
| 158 || September 24|| @ Chicago White Sox || L 3–6 || Danks (8–12) || Teaford (2–1) || || 26,249 || 69–89
|- bgcolor="bbffbb"
| 159 || September 25|| @ Chicago White Sox || W 2–1 || Mendoza (2–0) || Floyd (12–13) || Holland (4) || 22,018 || 70–89
|- bgcolor="bbffbb"
| 160 || September 26|| @ Minnesota Twins || W 7–3 || Paulino (4–10) || Slowey (0–8) || || 34,847 || 71–89
|- bgcolor="ffbbbb"
| 161 || September 27|| @ Minnesota Twins || L 4–7 || Swarzak (4–7) || O'Sullivan (2–6) || || 34,228 || 71–90
|- bgcolor="ffbbbb"
| 162 || September 28|| @ Minnesota Twins || L 0–1 || Pavano (9–13) || Wood (5–3) || || 36,488 || 71–91
|-

Roster

Player stats

Batting
Note: G = Games played; AB = At bats; R = Runs scored; H = Hits; 2B = Doubles; 3B = Triples; HR = Home runs; RBI = Runs batted in; AVG = Batting average; SB = Stolen bases

Stats through September 28, 2011

Pitching
Note: W = Wins; L = Losses; ERA = Earned run average; G = Games pitched; GS = Games started; SV = Saves; IP = Innings pitched; R = Runs allowed; ER = Earned runs allowed; BB = Walks allowed; SO = Strikeouts

Stats through September 28, 2011.

Farm system 

LEAGUE CHAMPIONS: Omaha

References
Kansas City Royals: Official web site

External links
2011 Kansas City Royals Official Site
2011 Kansas City Royals at Baseball Reference

Kansas City Royals
Kansas City Royals seasons
2011 in sports in Missouri